The 1958–59 season was the 75th football season in which Dumbarton competed at a Scottish national level, entering the Scottish Football League, the Scottish Cup and the Scottish League Cup.  In addition Dumbarton played in the Stirlingshire Cup.

Scottish Second Division

This was to be another 'almost' season for Dumbarton in Division 2, but as in the previous campaign the final run-in was to be decisive with only one win taken from the last six games.   It was to be 4th place again, with 45 points, 15 behind champions Ayr United.

Scottish League Cup

In the League Cup, qualification was there for the taking, with 3 wins and a draw from the first 5 games, but a final home defeat to Arbroath meant that Dumbarton would miss out again on progression.

Scottish Cup

In the Scottish Cup, after a good win over Highland League opposition, Division 1 opponents Kilmarnock were to prove to be too good for Dumbarton in the second round.

Stirlingshire Cup
Locally Dumbarton lost out to Stenhousemuir in the semi final of the Stirlingshire Cup.

Friendlies
Amongst the friendlies played during the season were three matches against English opposition - a 'home and away' tie against Accrington Stanley and an away trip to Colchester United.

Player statistics

|}

Source:

Transfers
Amongst those players joining and leaving the club were the following:

Players in

Players out 

Source:

Reserve team
Dumbarton played a 'reserve' team in the Combined Reserve League.  The season was split into two 'series' - with Dumbarton finishing runners up to Morton in the First Series (with 4 wins and 2 draws from 8 games) and winning the Second (with 6 wins from 8 games).

In addition, Dumbarton entered the Scottish Second XI Cup but were knocked out in the first round by Rangers.

References

Dumbarton F.C. seasons
Scottish football clubs 1958–59 season